MechWarrior is a series of video games set in the fictional universe of BattleTech.

Games

Within the MechWarrior games, players take control of a single BattleMech and combat other BattleMechs, tanks, infantry, and more, from within the cockpit of their machine. A third-person alternate view is available in MechWarrior  2, 3, 4, Online, and 5.  Both MechWarrior 2 and MechWarrior 3 were Origins Award winners, taking Best Fantasy or Science Fiction Computer Game 1995 and Best Action Computer Game 1999 respectively.

In-universe timeline
MechWarrior takes place at the end of the Third Succession War.
MechWarrior 2: 31st Century Combat, MechWarrior 2: Ghost Bear's Legacy, Mercenaries, and MechWarrior Online deal with the events soon before, during, and soon after the Clan Invasion of the Inner Sphere.
MechWarrior 3 and MechCommander are concerned with different parts of "Operation Serpent" and "Operation Bulldog", the combined Inner Sphere counterattack against the Clans, targeted at the Smoke Jaguars.
MechWarrior 4: Vengeance, its expansions, and MechCommander 2 deal with the Federated Commonwealth Civil War.
MechWarrior 5: Mercenaries takes place during the Third Succession War.

Live-action film
Electric Entertainment, a Hollywood production company founded by Dean Devlin, currently holds the option to produce a feature film based on the MechWarrior universe.  In 2003, Devlin approached Paramount to pitch the project but failed to receive funding.  The project is currently in development limbo.

See also
MechWarrior (role-playing game), a 1986 tabletop game

References

 
BattleTech games
Video game franchises
Microsoft franchises
Video game franchises introduced in 1989